Paraglaciecola arctica is a Gram-negative, psychrotolerant and motile bacterium from the genus of Paraglaciecola which has been isolated from sediments from the Arctic Ocean.

References

Bacteria described in 2011
Alteromonadales